"The Truth" is the 19th episode of the NBC sitcom Seinfeld. It is the second episode of the show's third season, first airing on September 25, 1991.  Directed by David Steinberg, this is the first episode (other than the pilot) not directed by Tom Cherones. Steinberg would later direct three others. The episode is the first written by Elaine Pope. She later co-wrote a Seinfeld episode with Larry Charles, "The Fix-Up", that won an Emmy Award in 1992 for Outstanding Individual Achievement in Writing in a Comedy Series. She also is credited for the story of one other episode, "The Cheever Letters". Both Steinberg as a guest star and Pope as a writer worked on Fridays, a show that included Larry David and Michael Richards as cast members.

Plot
Jerry is being audited by the IRS as a result of a fraudulent relief fund Kramer persuaded him to donate to. George gives Jerry's tax papers to his girlfriend Patrice, an accountant and former representative for the IRS.

At Monk's, George breaks up with Patrice, telling her that “It’s not you. It’s me.” After Patrice insists on the real reasons, George tells her he can't stand her pretentious and showy pronunciation habits. Patrice seems to take it well, but when Jerry finds out, he gets upset, as she hadn't finished his tax papers and he does not believe that she could be genuinely unoffended at being called pretentious.

Meanwhile, Elaine gets tired of Kramer dating her roommate Tina. They pour spaghetti sauce in the strainer, play loud tribal music, and have make-out sessions. Kramer uses a windshield that he found on the side of the road as a coffee table. Elaine is further upset after Kramer unknowingly walks into Elaine's bedroom and sees her naked.

George calls Patrice to ask about Jerry's tax papers, only to learn she checked into a depression clinic. Jerry and George go to visit her and George recants what he said about her being pretentious. She reveals to them that after the breakup, she got upset and threw out Jerry's tax papers. Jerry never made copies of the receipts that he collected over the years, so he begins tracking them down.

Elaine enters her apartment with dirty dishes piled high in the kitchen, loud tribal music playing, and Kramer dancing with only a towel wrapped around his waist. When Tina and Kramer ask Elaine if she is upset, she decides, after thinking about the problems George caused by telling the truth, to lie. She tells them they are a great couple. Kramer and Tina begin an African dance together but accidentally break the windshield coffee table as they move to the couch to make-out, severely injuring themselves and leading to Tina being admitted to the hospital.

Reception
The 16.7 million viewers (19% share, rank of 51) of the episode on its first airing fell well below the 21.7 million viewers (25% share, rank of 24) of the season three premiere, The Note. Web reviews generally give the episode a relatively low ranking. Matt Singer on Screen Crush ranks it at 153 out of 169, commenting that Jerry's storyline “feels like a waste.”  Larry Fitzmaurice on Vulture rates it at 134 out of 169.  The staff at Place to Be Nation give it ratings of 4 or 5 on a 1 to 10 scale.  Collin Jacobson on DVD Movie Guide calls it a solid show but too reliant on Kramer's “schtick.”  The hosts of Seincast find it solid but forgettable. More positively, Tina is one of their favorite Kramer girlfriends.

References

External links

Seinfeld (season 3) episodes
1991 American television episodes